Ottopasuuna is the eponymous debut album by Finnish folk ensemble Ottopasuuna, released in 1991. The influences for the songs range from Irish folk music to that of Eastern Europe, but is underlined by a Scandinavian touch.

Track listing

Personnel
 Petri Hakala – guitar, mandocello, mandolin
 Kurt Lindblad – clarinet, composer, flute, whistle
 Kimmo Pohjonen – harmonica, marimba, melodion
 Kari Reiman – composer, fiddle

References

1991 albums